Jessica Hullman is a computer scientist and the Ginni Rometty associate professor of Computer Science at Northwestern University. She is known for her research in Information visualization.

Education 
Hullman graduated magna cum laude from Ohio State University with a Bachelor of Arts degree in Comparative Studies. She obtained a Masters of Fine Arts degree in Writings and Poetics from Naropa University. Hullman received her Master of Science in Information and Ph.D in Information Science from the University of Michigan - School of Information, where she was advised by Eytan Adar. She completed a postdoctoral fellowship at the University of California, Berkeley Computer Science Department with Maneesh Agrawala.

Hullman started her career as faculty at the University of Washington Information School, where she was also adjunct assistant professor in Computer Science, and affiliated with the Interactive Data Lab and DUB (Design Use Build) group.

Work 
Jessica Hullman has published peer-reviewed journal articles on topics including uncertainty visualization, Bayesian cognition, automated design of data visualizations, narrative visualization, and evaluation of visualizations. Her work has contributed new visualization types to help readers develop an intuitive sense of uncertainty, such as hypothetical outcome plots. Notable works include

 Visual Reasoning Strategies for Effect Size Judgments and Decisions 
 In Pursuit of Error: A Survey of Uncertainty Visualization Evaluation 
 Visualization rhetoric: Framing effects in narrative visualization 
 A deeper understanding of sequence in narrative visualization 
 Hypothetical Outcome Plots Outperform Error Bars and Violin Plots for Inferences about Reliability of Variable Ordering

Hullman has given many invited lectures and keynote presentations, including "How to Visually Communicate Uncertain Data", "Beyond Visualization: Theories of Inference to Improve Data Analysis & Communication"  and "The Visual Uncertainty Experience" at OpenVisConf. Hullman is co-director of the Midwest Uncertainty (MU) Collective at Northwestern University.

In addition to her scholarly work, Hullman has written articles for the popular press related to visualizing uncertainty, including for Wired ("Is Your Chart a Detective Story? Or a Police Report?", with Andrew Gelman), Scientific American, The Hill and National Review ("We Need Better Risk Communication to Combat the Coronavirus", with Allison Schrager). She is a contributor to Andrew Gelman's blog, Statistical Modeling, Causal Inference, and Social Science and is the founder and editor of Multiple Views, a blog on visualization research.

Awards 

 Microsoft Research Faculty Fellowship - Microsoft, 2019
Best Paper Award - ACM VIS 2020, ACM CHI 2017
 Best Paper Award Honorable Mention - IEEE VIS 2021, ACM CHI 2020, ACM CHI 2018, IEEE VIS 2017, ACM CHI 2017, IEEE VIS 2011
 NSF CAREER Award, 2018
 NSF CRII Award - NSF, 2016
 Google Faculty Award - Google Research, 2015
 Tableau Software Postdoctoral Fellow (Inaugural) - University of California Berkeley, Computer Science, 2014
 Gary M. Olson Outstanding PhD Student - University of Michigan, School of Information, 2013
 Rackham Centennial Award Merit Scholar - University of Michigan, Rackham Graduate School, 2012
 Naropa 'Secret Attic' Faculty's Choice Best Master's Thesis Award - Naropa University, 2006

References

External links 

http://users.eecs.northwestern.edu/~jhullman/pubs.html

American women computer scientists
Living people
Year of birth missing (living people)
University of Michigan alumni
21st-century American women